Genealogia deorum gentilium, known in English as On the Genealogy of the Gods of the Gentiles, is a mythography or encyclopedic compilation of the tangled family relationships of the classical pantheons of Ancient Greece and Rome, written in Latin prose from 1360 onwards by the Italian author and poet Giovanni Boccaccio.

The work is "humanist in spirit and medieval in structure".   According to the Preface Boccaccio undertook the project at the request of Hugh IV of Cyprus.  The first version was completed in 1360, and he continuously corrected and revised the work until his death in 1374, so that various redactions of the works were copied in different manuscript traditions.  In his lifetime and for two centuries afterwards it was considered his most important work. 

The full range of genealogies of the classical Gods are described in the fifteen books, drawing on the standard earlier works, especially the Liber imaginum deorum, a 12th-century treatise by the otherwise unknown Albricus (possibly Alexander Neckam), and the older so-called Vatican Mythographies.  These themselves drew on the late antique Christian Fulgentius, and writers of the actual period of classical paganism, especially Ovid and Statius. Some Greek material was probably supplied by his Greek teacher Leontius Pilatus.

According to Malcolm Bull: "...Boccaccio does his best to make sense of the complex genealogy of the gods.  But as he also allows for several gods of the same name, the result becomes enormously confusing.  No subsequent mythographer followed his method of organizing material, yet Boccaccio's Genealogia retained its prestige and was to remain the most important mythological manual until the late sixteenth century."  The next attempt at an equally comprehensive compilation on the subject of mythological genealogy would not come until 1548, when Giglio Gregorio Giraldi published his De deis gentium.  The Genealogia was unkindly described by Edward Gibbon in his Decline and Fall as "a work, in that age, of stupendous erudition, and which he ostentatiously sprinkled with Greek characters and passages, to excite the wonder and applause of his more ignorant readers." and "a work which, though now forgotten, has run through thirteen or fourteen editions", although in fact there is evidence that Coleridge and Wordsworth read it together.

Boccaccio was responsible for spreading the story, which he credited to Theodontius, that Demogorgon was the ancestor of all the heathen gods — based on a misspelled  scholion to Statius, which had intended to claim ancestry for Plato's Demiurge. This gave rise to a literary and iconographic tradition lasting to John Milton and Shelley. From the earliest manuscripts, some believed to be Boccaccio autographs, diagrammatic family trees are included, which are thought to be the earliest non-Biblical uses of this type of graphic, which was already used in the form of the Jesse tree in art.

The last two books of the work include a defence of poetry that is his latest and most extended discussion of the subject.

Translations
 French: Jean Miélot 1468, produced for Philip the Good, Duke of Burgundy
 English: The first volume of a projected three-volume set titled Genealogy of the Pagan Gods, translated by Jon Solomon, was published in May, 2011, by Harvard University Press under the I Tatti Renaissance Library imprint. A second volume was released in October, 2017.

Printed editions
The first printed edition was in Venice at the early date of 1472, of a version with some additions to the Genealogia, and other short works by Boccaccio, shortly followed by an edition of 1473 which was the first book printed in Leuven. Four further Italian incunabulum editions were published (including in 1497), and a French translation in 1498 or 1499.  All survive in healthy numbers, confirming the popularity of the work, which was reprinted in many more 16th century editions, some illustrated.

References

Notes

Boccaccio On Poetry, ed. Charles H. Osgood Princeton University Press, 1929; a translation of the Preface and books XIV and XV.
Malcolm Bull, The Mirror of the Gods, How Renaissance Artists Rediscovered the Pagan Gods, Oxford UP, 2005,

External links
The entire work in Latin on Wikisource
Illuminated manuscript, Italian 1388, from the British Library, with historiated initials (portraits)
Online available italian translation from 1569.

14th-century Latin books
Incunabula
Works by Giovanni Boccaccio
References on Greek mythology